The men's individual road race at the 1960 Summer Olympics in Rome, Italy, was held on 30 August 1960. There were 142 participants from 42 nations. Each nation could enter up to four cyclists. Of the 142 starters 76 rode the distance to the end. The event was won by Viktor Kapitonov of the Soviet Union, the nation's first medal in the event. Livio Trapè of Italy took silver, putting that country on the podium for the second consecutive Games. Willy Vanden Berghen's bronze gave Belgium its fourth medal in four Games (one in 1948, two in 1952, none in 1956).

Background

This was the sixth appearance of the event, previously held in 1896 and then at every Summer Olympics since 1936. It replaced the individual time trial event that had been held from 1912 to 1932 (and which would be reintroduced alongside the road race in 1996). The favorites were the German riders Gustav-Adolf Schur (1958 and 1959 world champion) and Bernhard Eckstein (1960 world champion).

For the first time since the reintroduction of the event in 1936, there was no corresponding team event (it had been replaced by a separate team time trial). The Danish riders entered in the individual event withdrew after the death of Knud Enemark Jensen in the team time trial. 

The British West Indies, Indonesia, Iraq, Ireland, Israel, Malta, Morocco, Portugal, San Marino, Spain, Ceylon (Sri Lanka), and Tunisia each made their debut in the men's individual road race; East and West Germany competed as the United Team of Germany. Great Britain made its sixth appearance in the event, the only nation to have competed in each appearance to date.

Competition format and course

The mass-start race was on a course that covered 12 laps of a 14.615 kilometres circuit known as the "Grottarossa Circuit," for a total of 175.38 kilometres. The course ran along the Via Flaminia, the Via Di Grottarossa, and the Via Cassia. Each lap included "a slightly steep climb, and a series of switchbacks, just after the 6 km. point, and then ascended gently for the next 2½ km."

Schedule

All times are Central European Time (UTC+1)

The day was hot, despite the morning start, with temperatures at 38 degrees Celsius.

Results

The first break was by van Kreuningen in lap 2. He led by himself until lap 5 when his teammate Hugens joined him. In lap 7, however, the pair was caught by a pack of seven cyclists. Additional cyclists moved up into the lead group in laps 7 and 8. The next significant breakaway from that bunch was by Trapè and Kapitonov in lap 10. Kapitonov broke into a sprint to finish lap 11, apparently confused as to how many laps had been completed. Trapè caught up to him, with a large (39 cyclists) chase pack bearing down on the pair in the actual final lap, lap 12. Kapitonov successfully repeated his sprint to beat Trapè, and the chase pack ultimately did not come within 20 seconds of the pair.

The Official Report lists only the finishers, requiring historians to put together a list of non-finishers from other sources. Further, the finish-line judge left to have lunch and the placement of the finishers is suspect based on photographs and personal reports from the cyclists.

References

Cycling at the Summer Olympics – Men's road race
Road cycling at the 1960 Summer Olympics